Rhizotrogus creticus is a species of beetle in the Melolonthinae subfamily that is endemic to Crete.

References

Beetles described in 1891
creticus
Beetles of Europe
Endemic arthropods of Crete